The Bureaucrats (French: Messieurs les ronds de cuir) is a 1959 French comedy film directed by Henri Diamant-Berger and starring  Noël-Noël, Philippe Clay and Jean Richard. It was shot at the Billancourt Studios in Paris. The film's art direction was by Roger Briaucourt. It is a remake of the 1936 film of the same title, with both based on a novel by Georges Courteline.

Partial cast
  Noël-Noël as M. de la Hourmerie  
 Philippe Clay as Letondu  
 Jean Richard as Boudin 
 Jacques Grello  as Chavarax  
 Paul Demange as Ovide 
 Bernard Lavalette as Van Der Hogen  
 Lucien Baroux as Le père Soupe  
 Pierre Brasseur as M. Nègre  
 Pierre Doris as Léonce 
 Jean Poiret as René Lahrier  
 Micheline Dax as Gaby  
 Mathilde Casadesus as Mme Nègre  
 Robert Burnier as Rodolphe Salis  
 Madeleine Suffel as Mme de La Hourmerie  
 Hubert Deschamps as Le curé dans le train  
 Jean Parédès  as Gorguchon

References

Bibliography 
 Dayna Oscherwitz & MaryEllen Higgins. The A to Z of French Cinema. Scarecrow Press, 2009.

External links 
 

1959 films
French comedy films
1959 comedy films
1950s French-language films
Films directed by Henri Diamant-Berger
1950s French films
Films shot at Billancourt Studios
Remakes of French films
Films based on French novels